The Fish in Love is a 1999 Italian romantic comedy film directed by Leonardo Pieraccioni, who also stars alongside Yamila Diaz.

Pieraccioni stars as Arturo, a writer of children's books, and Diaz stars as Matilde, the woman he falls in love with.

Plot 
In Florence, the young carpenter Arturo dreams of becoming a great writer. In fact he has the talent to be able to write fantasy stories for children, and so he is snubbed by Italian critics. However Arturo does not give up, and sends the proofs to a famous Florentine editor. Meanwhile, the family of Arturo is broke because his uncle is gone bankrupt with an useless shop. But fame for Arturo arrives early, because the publisher remains excited about the fantastic stories, and so the book is published with the title: The Fish in Love. Arturo starts to know celebrity and wealth, but soon gets bored, because he feels himself suffocated by the fame. Indeed Arturo falls in love with beautiful Matilde, promised in marriage to a pompous man of Bergamo. With her, Arturo flees into a house in the woods, and plans a new life, just like in the fairy tales.

Cast 
Leonardo Pieraccioni as Arturo Vannino
Yamila Diaz as Matilde Ventura
Paolo Hendel as Primo
Patrizia Loreti as Signorina Benincasa
Gabriella Pession as Lucilla Pacini
Angelo Russo as Maresciallo Scarchilli
Rodolfo Corsato as Valeriano
Rosanna Susini as Arturo's mother
Sergio Forconi as Arturo's father
Vincenzo Versari as uncle Arnaldo
Don Lurio as Pacini
Philippe Leroy as the chauffeur
Dario Ballantini as Domenico Costanzo
Hal Yamanouchi as the consul of Korea

References

External links 
 

1999 films
1990s Italian-language films
1999 comedy films
Films directed by Leonardo Pieraccioni
Films set in Tuscany
Films set in Florence
Films set in Venice
Italian comedy films
Italian romantic comedy films
1990s Italian films